The Intertrappean Beds are a Late Cretaceous geologic formation in India. The beds are found as interbeds between Deccan Traps layers. Indeterminate theropod and pterosaur remains have been recovered from the formation, as well as dinosaur eggs. The mammal genera Deccanolestes, Sahnitherium, Bharattherium, and Kharmerungulatum have been recovered from it as well. A rich plant flora is known from the formation.

Paleobiota

Lepidosaurs

Mammals

Flora

See also 

Lameta Formation
 List of dinosaur-bearing rock formations
 List of stratigraphic units with indeterminate dinosaur fossils
 List of pterosaur-bearing stratigraphic units

Footnotes

References
 Weishampel, David B.; Dodson, Peter; and Osmólska, Halszka (eds.): The Dinosauria, 2nd, Berkeley: University of California Press. 861 pp. .

Geologic formations of India
Maastrichtian Stage
Ooliferous formations